Rauan Kenzhekhanuly (born 1 May 1979) is a Kazakh entrepreneur and NGO activist who was named the first Wikipedian of the Year in August 2011 by Wikipedia co-founder Jimmy Wales at Wikimania.

Career 
Kenzhekhanuly was born on 1 May 1979 in the East Kazakhstan region. In 2001, he graduated from Almaty University (named after Abay Kunanbayev) with a bachelor's degree in international affairs.

In 2005–2006, he worked as a Press secretary and Head of the Department of Cultural and Humanitarian Cooperation of the Embassy of Kazakhstan in the Russian Federation.

During the university years served as the Program Coordinator for National Debate Center Public Foundation and chief-editor of Youth TV program "Azamat" on national TV channel Khabar. After he joined Khabar TV Agency as the economic observer and National TV Agency's Moscow bureau chief in Russian Federation.

In 2010, he traveled to the United States to do a one-year fellowship at Harvard University, where, that fall, he first became interested in editing Wikipedia when he took the class "Media, Politics, and Power in the Digital Age". The same year, he was named one of the Weatherhead Center for International Affairs's fellows for 2010–2011. He later founded the nonprofit organization WikiBilim, which aims to expand the availability of free Kazakh-language information on the Internet. In 2014, he was named deputy governor of the Kyzylorda Region.

He also served as the founding director of the Eurasian Council on Foreign Affairs, which was formally established on 12 November 2014 with a grant from the Kazakh government.

Public activities 
In 2016, he founded non-profit organization Bilim Foundation with the mission to set up the national program of adolescence suicide prevention and developing lifeskills.

In 2017, he was appointed as the chief of commission for a national project "translating 100 textbooks for HE to Kazakh language".

See also
 List of Wikipedia people

References

21st-century Kazakhstani politicians
Living people
Wikipedia people
Wikimedians of the Year
Harvard University alumni
Kazakhstani emigrants to the United States
People from Kyzylorda Region
Kazakhstani politicians
1979 births